Elizabeth Thompson (born 8 December 1994) is a New Zealand field hockey player who plays for the national team. She competed in the women's hockey tournament at the  where she won a bronze medal.

References

External links
 

1994 births
Living people
New Zealand female field hockey players
Commonwealth Games bronze medallists for New Zealand
Field hockey players at the 2014 Commonwealth Games
Field hockey players at the 2016 Summer Olympics
Olympic field hockey players of New Zealand
Sportspeople from Thames, New Zealand
Commonwealth Games medallists in field hockey
Female field hockey defenders
Commonwealth Games gold medallists for New Zealand
Field hockey players at the 2018 Commonwealth Games
Field hockey players at the 2020 Summer Olympics
Medallists at the 2014 Commonwealth Games
Medallists at the 2018 Commonwealth Games